The Capitoline Wolf Statue was a sculpture of a she-wolf nursing Romulus and Remus in Cincinnati, Ohio, United States. The bronze sculpture on a granite and marble base was located in Eden Park at the Twin Lakes area overlooking the Ohio River. It was an exact replica of the original Capitoline Wolf in the Musei Capitolini of Rome, Italy.

Italian dictator Benito Mussolini sent a small version of the statue for a 1929 Sons of Italy national convention in Cincinnati. It was replaced by a larger one in 1931, which is the version that still stands in Eden Park. The sculpture was meant to honor Cincinnatus, the namesake of Cincinnati. It was inscribed with the Latin Anno X (year ten), indicating 1931, the tenth year of Mussolini's regime.

On January 6, 2020, Cincinnati City Council member Chris Seelbach tweeted that he wants the statue to be removed. Seelbach stated "Statues from the monster that was Benito Mussolini don’t belong in our parks. Museums? Maybe. But not Cincinnati Parks. I’m drafting legislation tomorrow to have the statue permanently removed." Shortly afterwards, Seelbach indefinitely delayed his plans to have the statue removed, saying "There’s been a lot of feedback about removing the statue from Eden Park. Instead of introducing legislation today to remove it, I’ll continue to listen and have conversations with all interested parties before making any formal decisions on its potential future."

The statue was reported missing on June 17, 2022. A thief stole the wolf portion of the statue after cutting it off at its ankles, but left the statues of Romulus and Remus. According to Councilman Jeff Cramerding, the Cincinnati Police believed that the statue was stolen so that it could be used as scrap. He also announced that he would file a motion to offer $50,000 "for information that leads to the safe return of the wolf".

References

Bronze sculptures in Ohio
Buildings and structures in Cincinnati
Italy–United States relations
Outdoor sculptures in Cincinnati
Statues in Ohio
Wolves in art
She-wolf (Roman mythology)
Cultural depictions of Romulus and Remus
Sculptures of classical mythology
Stolen works of art